Bald refers to a noun that is or considered to be "Bald."

Bald may also refer to:

Places 
Báld, the Hungarian name for Balda village, Sărmașu, Romania
Appalachian balds, a type of mountain summit in the Appalachian Mountains
Bald Head, Antarctica
Bald Hill (Australia)
Bald Hill (Farmingville, New York)
Bald Hills, Queensland
Bald Island, Western Australia
Bald Knob, Arkansas
Bald Knob, West Virginia
Bald Mountain (disambiguation):
Bald Point, Florida
Bald River, Tennessee

People 

Bald (surname)

Animals
Bald eagle, a bird of prey found in North America
Bald-faced hornet, a large member of the yellowjacket genus found in North America

Arts, entertainment, and media
"Bald" (song), a 2005 song by The Darkness
Bald: The Making of THX 1138 (1971), a short film directed by George Lucas
Bald! (2003), a documentary on baldness

See also 
Baldhead (disambiguation)
Baldy (disambiguation)